Port Loyola is an electoral constituency in the Belize District represented in the House of Representatives of the National Assembly of Belize since 2020 by  Gilroy Usher of the People's United Party (PUP).

Port Loyola contains some of the worst conditions in Belize City's Southside, and has a high crime rate. St. John Vianney Roman Catholic Primary School lies within the district.

History 
Port Loyola, extending from the North Creek to the Port Authority and eastward to the Yarborough Bridge, was created in 1984 on the eve of that year's legislative elections. Its first representative was businessman Henry Young, who was reelected in 1989 and 1993 before stepping aside in 1998.

In 1998, the UDP selected Anthony "Boots" Martinez to contest the division against lawyer Dolores Balderamos-García. Balderamos-García defeated Martinez badly and served until 2003, when Martinez won election.

Area Representatives

Elections

External links
 belize.gov.bz feature

References 

Belizean House constituencies established in 1984
Government of Belize
Political divisions in Belize
Port Loyola